Young Criminals' Starvation League is the first studio album by American singer-songwriter Bobby Bare Jr. The album was released in July 2002 and has been described as "melancholy, decidedly disheveled, and rootsy". It has elements of alternative rock and alternative country, along with "a fascination with early-1970s classic country".

Track listing
All writing by Bobby Bare Jr. except where noted.

Personnel

 Bobby Bare Jr. – guitar, harmonica, vocals
 Kevin Teel – guitar, bass, steel guitar, mandolin
 Paul Burch – drums
 Lloyd Barry, George Chambers, Waldo Weathers – horns
 Tony Crow – keyboard
 Carey Kotsionis – background vocals
 Paul Niehaus – steel guitar
 Matt Swanson – bass
Artwork by Thomas Petillo and Markus Greiner.

External links 
 Young Criminals' Starvation League at Bloodshot Records

References

2002 albums
Bobby Bare Jr. albums